The voiceless uvular plosive or stop is a type of consonantal sound, used in some spoken languages. It is pronounced like a voiceless velar plosive , except that the tongue makes contact not on the soft palate but on the uvula.

There is also the voiceless pre-uvular plosive in some languages, which is articulated slightly more front compared with the place of articulation of the prototypical uvular consonant, though not as front as the prototypical velar consonant. The equivalent X-SAMPA symbols are q_+ and k_-, respectively.

Features

Features of the voiceless uvular stop:

Occurrence

See also
 Guttural
 Index of phonetics articles
 Qoph
 Voiced uvular stop

Notes

References

External links
 

Uvular consonants
Pulmonic consonants
Voiceless oral consonants
Central consonants
Voiceless stops